Akrata railway station is a railway station in Akrata, a small seaside town in Achaea, Greece. It is located just south of Akrata, close to the Olympia Odos motorway.

The station originally opened in 1887, as part of the Piraeus–Patras railway: the line closed on 9 July 2007, and the station was rebuilt as part of the extension of the standard gauge Athens Airport–Patras railway to Aigio, co-financed by the European Union's Cohesion Fund 2000–2006. The new station opened on 22 June 2020.

History
The Station opened 22 June 2020 by Minister of Transport, Kostas Karamanlis. as part of the €848-million ErgOSE project extension of the Athens Airport–Patras railway to Aigio railline co-financed by the European Union's Cohesion Fund 2000–2006. It was one of three new stations in (Xylokastro, Akrata, and Aegio) and six holts (Diminio, Lykoporia, Lygia, Platanos Beach, Diakopto, and Eliki) to come online when the section of track opened. It should not be confused with the now-closed station on the old Piraeus–Patras railway SPAP, which is located northeast of the current station, closer to the coast of the Corinthian Gulf.

Facilities
The raised station is assessed via stairs or a ramp. It has two side platforms, with station buildings located on platform 1, with access to the platform level via stairs or lifts. The Station buildings are equipped with a booking office (not yet operational) and toilets. At platform level, there are sheltered seating, an air-conditioned indoor passenger shelter (as of 2020 not open) and Dot-matrix display departure and arrival screens and timetable poster boards on both platforms. There is a large car park on-site, adjacent to the eastbound line. Currently, there is no local bus stop connecting the station.

Services

Since 15 May 2022, this station serves the following routes:

Station layout

See also
Railway stations in Greece
Hellenic Railways Organization
Hellenic Train
Proastiakos

References

Akrata
Achaea
Buildings and structures in Achaea
Transport in Achaea
Railway stations in Achaea
Railway stations opened in 2020